In policy debate, a disadvantage (here abbreviated as DA) is an argument that a team brings up against a policy action that is being considered. A disadvantage is also used in the Lincoln-Douglas debate format.

Structure
A disadvantage usually has four key elements. These four elements are not always necessary depending on the type of disadvantage run, and some are often combined into a single piece of evidence. A Unique Link card, for example, will include both a description of the status quo and the plan's effect on it. A traditional threshold DA has a structure as follows:

Uniqueness

Uniqueness shows why the impacts have not occurred yet or to a substantial extent and will uniquely occur with the adoption of either the affirmative's plan or the negative's counterplan.

For example, the negative team argues that the affirmative plan will result in nuclear proliferation, it would also argue that the status quo will avoid nuclear proliferation.  If the Affirmative claims that nuclear proliferation is already occurring, the negative team could argue that adoption of the plan would result in a unique increase in nuclear proliferation.  If the plan causes no net change in the rate of nuclear proliferation, the disadvantage is not unique to the plan, and therefore not relevant.

External links
For the disadvantage to have relevance in the round, the negative team must show that the affirmative plan causes the disadvantage that is claimed.  If the DA stated that the plan takes money from the government, and the affirmative team shows that the plan does not increase governmental spending, then the DA would be considered to have "no link".

Internal link

The internal link connects the link to the impact, or, it shows the steps the link causes to get to the impact. Not all DA's use an internal link but some have multiple internals. The internal link in our example would be that government spending leads to economic collapse.

Impact
The impact is the result of the policy action that make it undesirable. These results are at the end of the chain of reasoning of your DA (starts with your link with internal links spanning over the Brink with Uniqueness and lead to the Impact), then continuing along with the example, an impact would be that economic collapse may cause nuclear war. The Impact is the edge of the sword of your DA and is usually a significantly bad event caused by inertia evident through the internal links inside the link off over the brink and uniquely so.

Internal links are often undesirable things by themselves, and could be considered impacts. The worst of the consequences, or the final one in the chain of events, is usually given the label of "impact".  For example, nuclear war is probably worse than economic collapse, so nuclear war is given the "impact" label, even though economic collapse (the internal link) could itself be viewed as an impact.

The nuclear war impact is the terminal (i.e. final) impact in virtually every disadvantage today. While it appears outlandish to outsiders and even to some debaters now, it originated in the 1980s during the height of the nuclear freeze movement, specifically after the publication of The Fate of the Earth by Jonathan Schell. Barring nuclear war, the terminal impact usually ends up as extinction anyway, either human extinction or the extinction of all life on Earth; the most common mechanisms for these are cataclysmic climatic change (in the style of The Day After Tomorrow), or uncontrolled undiscovered uncurable disease. Most debate coaches use the nuclear war argument as  a way of training young policy debaters.

Other terminal impacts might include severe human rights abuses, such as near universal slavery or loss of individuality.  These types of impacts are usually argued under a deontological framework or as a turn to a human rights advantage

Types

Traditional
A traditional DA follows the structure above.  Traditional DA's can include or exclude the internal link.

Linear
A linear disadvantage does not have uniqueness.  The negative concedes that the status quo has a problem but insists the plan increases that problem's severity. A commonly accepted theory holds that a sufficiently philosophical linear disadvantage with an alternative becomes a kritik. There is also much controversy over kritiks being linear disadvantages, due to the fact that most kritik argue the affirmative plan over a discursive level, while a disadvantage argues the affirmative's actions.

Non-kritikal linear disadvantages frequently face attacks from the Affirmative on debate theory; the theory that linear disadvantages are abusive (i.e. unfair) to the affirmative team has much popularity.

Brink
A brink disadvantage is a special type of linear disadvantage which claims that the affirmative will aggravate the problem in the status quo to the extent that it passes a brink, at which time the impact happens all at once. The negative team claims that in the status quo, we are near the brink, but the affirmative team's plan will push us "over the edge."

Political
A political disadvantage is unique in the way that it links to affirmative plan . Rather than linking to the specific plan action, it links to the fact that a plan passes at all. Politics disadvantages typically will say that a plan will pass through Congress, thus causing a shift in the "political capital" of either the president, or a political party, which will affect
the ability of the affected group to pass other bills. An example of a politics disadvantage would be: Uniqueness: Immigration Reform will pass in the status quo. Link: Plan decreases the President's political capital, perhaps with a specific link that increasing civil liberties would be a flip-flop for President Obama. Thus, Obama has no political capital to pass his Immigration Reform. Impact elections cycles. For example, in a presidential election, it might argue that a certain Presidential candidate or his or her opponent is currently weak (or strong), but the affirmative plan will cause him or her to gain (or lose) popularity, and that either his or her election is undesirable or the election of his or her opponent is undesirable.  A midterms version could focus on particular races or the general balance of the Congress; an example of a single-race midterms disadvantage would be that the reelection of Senator Daniel Akaka is critical to free speech, and plan prevents Akaka from winning; a "balance of Congress" disadvantage might hold that the plan is a credit to the Republicans, who would increase their grip on Congress and allow extensive drilling in the Arctic National Wildlife Refuge.

In some sections of the country, politics disadvantages are frowned upon because they link to virtually every affirmative plan, destroying the on case debate and focusing solely on the disadvantage. Supporters say the politics disadvantages are "real world" and provide education on how bills are passed and politics in general.

Other debate theorists have recently created a model of fiat that appears to preclude the politics disadvantage. Its use in any given debate round is entirely dependent on how well the affirmative argues that the judge should accept the model, a somewhat time-consuming process. Examples of these fiat arguments include Vote No and Intrinsicness. Vote No argues that the debate should be a simulation of the debate before Congress and thus the president has already exerted political capital, meaning there is no disadvantage. Intrinsicness, popularized by New Trier Coach Michael Greenstein, says that there is no reason that Congress can't pass both the plan and the bill, meaning they are not competive.

Responses
Disadvantage responses can generally be classified into two categories: takeouts, which simply seek to refute a claim made by the negative in the disadvantage, and turns, which argue that the situation is somehow the reverse of the negative's claim.

Takeouts

Non-unique

The "non-unique" argument says that the impact will happen in the status quo with or without the passage of the plan or that it is happening in the status quo. The links and impacts (and thus the entire disadvantage) become largely irrelevant since the status quo is no different from the plan.

No link
A very simple argument. The affirmative simply claims that the plan does not cause the impact.

An example:

Uniqueness: The United States-India nuclear deal is likely to pass now, but just barely. It requires extensive expenditure of limited political capital.
Link: The plan uses political capital that would otherwise be used for passage of the deal.
Internal Link: Failure to pass the deal will reduce American influence on the Indian subcontinent.
Internal Link: Reduction of American influence on the Indian subcontinent will lead to nuclear war between India and Pakistan.
Impact: India-Pakistan nuclear war will spiral out of control into a global nuclear conflict.

No link: The plan expends no political capital

No internal link
A variant on the No Link, it states that either the link or the previous internal link does not lead to another internal link.

Using the example above, a no-internal-link could either be that the failure to pass the deal will not reduce American influence on the Indian subcontinent, or that reduction of American influence on the Indian subcontinent will not lead to nuclear war between India and Pakistan.

Impact uniqueness
Arguing the impact's uniqueness is an underused but effective argument. To prove that an impact is non-unique the affirmative must show that the link has already happened in the past but the impact didn't happen.

For example:

Uniqueness: American oil consumption high now!

Link: Ethanol trades off with oil!

Internal: OPEC will flood the market with cheap oil

Impact: Destroys Russian and Canadian Economies—global economic collapse—Nuclear war!

Impact Uniqueness—OPEC flooded the market last year with really cheap oil and there was no nuclear war

Turns

Link
The link turn is generally accepted to be a better attack on a disadvantage than the defensive take-out arguments, as it is an offensive argument. The link-turn is in two parts: a card that says the disadvantage is non-unique (the impact is going to happen in the status quo)--and reading a link-turn (a piece of evidence that states the plan does the opposite of what the negative link says).

For example:

Original DA

Uniqueness: US Military Strong

Link: Plan Decreases military power

Impact: Weak military leads to nuclear conflict.

A non-unique and a link turn would go something like this:

Non-unique: Military weak now.

Link Turn: Plan increases military power.

This strategy turns what was previously a "disadvantage" to the plan into a benefit or advantage of the plan. This helps the affirmative debaters prove that they should win on presumption(that the aff plan is proven to be the better policy option than the status quo).

Impact
Another way to debate against a disadvantage is an impact turn, in which the affirmative team reads evidence stating that the disadvantages impact would actually be good or that the status quo creates a worse impact. If the impact to a disadvantage was global nuclear war, an impact turn would say that death is good or that the status quo creates a bigger nuclear war.  Often impact turns function at the level above this.  The argument is then sometimes called an internal link turn.  For example, if the disadvantage argued that the plan hurt free trade, which was key to avoiding war, the affirmative might argue that in fact free trade caused war, environmental destruction, and other negative consequences.

Straight
One strategy the affirmative may use in order to attack the Disadvantage is to "straight turn it." To straight turn something means to run only offensive arguments against it. Such an example would be to run 3 impact turns against a Disadvantage. This forces the negative team to not kick the Disadvantage because it automatically becomes an extra advantage for the affirmative. If the affirmative did run defensive arguments such as non-unique and an impact turn, then the negative could concede that it is non-unique so the impact turn would be rendered useless thus the negative could kick out of the disadvantage.

The affirmative team should never run an impact turn and a link turn together—this is called double turning. When the affirmative team double turns themself they claim that "right now the status quo is doing something, and the affirmative plan stops it, but what the affirmative stops is a good thing." In simple terms, the affirmative runs a disadvantage on themselves.

Other
In answering the Link, an affirmative might argue that the link has no threshold, i.e. that the link does not make clear when the impact will happen or even that the impact will happen solely based on what the affirmative plan causes. Or the aff may claim that uniqueness overwhelms the link; that conditions in the status quo are so far away from the threshold that the impact will not happen.  This second answer is rarely made because it is a strategic gamble.

A disadvantage can also be answered by no longer doing a part of the plan that causes the aff to link into the disadvantage.  This is often referred to as a severance perm, because by making this claim the affirmative does all parts of the plan except the part that links to the disadvantage, thus severing out of part of their own plan.  This argument is also rarely made, due to the theory arguments it brings up on the affirmative changing its plan in the round in order to avoid the disadvantage.

Also if the negative runs a Counterplan in addition to the Disadvantage (which commonly occurs) the affirmative can make a permutation and say that the combination of the counterplan and plan shields the link to the disadvantage. For example: the plan repeals the Hyde Amendment to allow abortion funding through federal sources by using congress; the negative runs a courts counterplan that repels the hyde amendment and runs a politics disadvantage that says the plan will drain the political capital of the president which causes a certain bill not to be passed; the affirmative would claim that the "perm shields the link" because congress would claim that the courts made them repeal the hyde amendment, therefore no political capital would be lost.

See also 
 Advantage

References

Cheshier, David. (2003). Politics, Politics, Politics. Rostrum.

Policy debate